Mikheyevo is a rural locality (a village) in Kichmegnskoye Rural Settlement, Kichmengsko-Gorodetsky District, Vologda Oblast, Russia. The population was 15 as of 2002.

Geography 
Mikheyevo is located 32 km southwest of Kichmengsky Gorodok (the district's administrative centre) by road. Grigorovo is the nearest rural locality.

References 

Rural localities in Kichmengsko-Gorodetsky District